The EMD SD50 is a  diesel-electric locomotive built by General Motors Electro-Motive Division. It was introduced in May 1981 as part of EMD's "50 Series"; production ceased in January 1986. The SD50 was a transitional model between EMD's Dash 2 series which was produced throughout the 1970s and the microprocessor-equipped SD60 and SD70 locomotives. A total of 431 were built.

History
The SD50 was produced in response to increasingly tough competition from GE Transportation, whose Dash 7 line was proving quite successful with railroads. EMD responded throughout the SD50 program by offering discounts on large orders.

The GM-EMD locomotives that immediately preceded the SD50, the  SD45 and SD45-2, used huge, 20-cylinder engines that consumed large amounts of fuel and suffered from reliability problems when first introduced. Demand for the 45 series dropped sharply after the 1970s fuel crisis. This proved to be a step too far; the 50 series models were plagued by engine and electrical system problems which harmed EMD's sales and reputation.

Compared with their predecessors, the SD50 had a longer frame and a substantially longer long hood. In addition, the resistors for the dynamic brake grid were moved from their location on previous models above the prime mover to a new, cooler location in front of the engine compartment air intakes, closer to the electrical switchgear. This increased their separation from other systems, simplifying maintenance for the prime mover and the electrical system.

One former SD50 engineer praised the locomotives' wheel-slip control system and dynamic braking power, stating "they were able to give more adhesion than a SD40-2".

Technical
The SD50 is powered by V16 16-645F3 series diesel engine driving either an EMD AR11A-D14 or an EMD AR16A-D18 traction alternator. The power generated by the traction alternator drove 6 EMD D87 traction motors rated at 1170 amps each.

The SD50 was also available with  wheels.

The SD50 was also available with either HT-C trucks (identified with a hydraulic shock on the side of the middle axle of each truck) or the earlier Flexicoil trucks. Some investigators implicated the HT-C truck in derailments of Amtrak's SDP40Fs, so Conrail chose the Flexicoil C trucks for their SD40-2s and their first order of SD50s—the only customer to do so. The controversy surrounding the HT-C truck was eventually disproved, and Conrail chose HT-C trucks for their second order of SD50s and SD60s.

SD50S
The SD50S ("short frame") were prototype units built in December 1980. There were six SD50Ss built, all of which were sold to the Norfolk & Western and eventually passed to Norfolk Southern. They were withdrawn in the early 2000s as non-standard. Two were rebuilt in 2008 as "SD40E" models by Norfolk Southern's Juniata Shops, along with several standard length SD50s.

The SD50S designation was also used for five locomotives built by EMD Australian licensee Clyde Engineering, Adelaide for Hamersley Iron. Shorter than production SD50s, they were equipped with a special double cab roof for insulation against the hot Australian desert sun in the Pilbara region. Withdrawn in November 1995, they were sold to National Railway Equipment Company and exported to the United States in February 1999 and used in national lease service. They were subsequently sold to the Utah Railway in June 2001. In June 2017, 6063 and 6064 were sold to the Chicago, Fort Wayne & Eastern Railroad, 6064 was relocated by Genesee & Wyoming to the Indiana & Ohio Railway and renumbered 5017.

SD50F
The SD50F was a Canadian cowl unit version equipped with a "Draper taper" (inset section aft of cab for limited rear visibility). Sixty were built for the Canadian National Railway as road numbers 5400–5459.

Original owners

Rebuilds
A number of SD50s have been rebuilt into the equivalent of SD40-2s. The Dash 2 features are already contained within the SD50. This is actually a quite simple change to the locomotive's Woodward PGE engine governor.

Preservation
In late October 2022, the Illinois Railway Museum acquired former Chicago & North Western #7009, believed by the museum to be the first preserved SD50.

See also
List of GM-EMD locomotives
List of GMD Locomotives

References

External links

Lytle, Stan. EMD SD50 list. Retrieved 16 February 2005.
TrainWeb.com. The Unofficial EMD homepage. Retrieved 7 January 2005. Contains fairly complete builders' records for EMD production.

EMD 50 Series locomotives
C-C locomotives
Clyde Engineering locomotives
Diesel-electric locomotives of the United States
Diesel locomotives of Western Australia
SD50
Freight locomotives
SD50
Railway locomotives introduced in 1980
Standard gauge locomotives of the United States
Standard gauge locomotives of Canada
Standard gauge locomotives of Australia
Diesel-electric locomotives of Australia